The Notre Dame Shakespeare Festival (formerly Summer Shakespeare) at the University of Notre Dame is an annual festival that seeks to combine professional productions of the works of William Shakespeare with community engagement and educational programs. The Notre Dame Shakespeare Festival is a part of the University of Notre Dame's Shakespeare initiative entitled "Shakespeare at Notre Dame", a program that recognizes the centrality of the study of Shakespeare in humanistic pedagogy at the University. Its fifteenth season (summer of 2014) was known as the 15/150, also celebrating the 450th birthday of William Shakespeare, and the 150th anniversary of the first full production of Shakespeare at the university in 1864 (Records indicate the first performance of Shakespeare at the University of Notre Dame took place in 1847, a collection of scenes also from Henry IV). The anniversary season consisted of the Professional Company production of Henry IV (directed by Michael Goldberg), the Young Company performance of The Merry Wives of Windsor (directed by West Hyler), and the annual ShakeScenes shows featuring actors of all ages from South Bend and the surrounding community.

History 
The Notre Dame Shakespeare Festival, (the professional theatre in residence at the University of Notre Dame), is a direct outgrowth of an experimental course called "Shakespeare in Performance" created in 1989 by Dr. Paul Rathburn, NDSF's founder. The premise of this course was that Shakespeare's works are both theatrical scripts and literary texts and are illuminated best through work in both the theater and in the classroom. It began in the summer of 2000 with the program's inaugural production, The Taming of the Shrew, but has since evolved to include guest artists and productions, the ShakeScenes community program, and a Young Company production produced and staffed entirely by Notre Dame and Saint Mary's students. Following the 2005 production of Henry V, Dr. Paul Rathburn retired from his role as Producing Artistic Director. The company's Artistic Director from 2006 - 2012 was Jay Paul Skelton. The current Ryan Producing Artistic Director for the Notre Dame Shakespeare Festival is Grant Mudge. The resident lighting designer for the festival since its inception has been ND Associate Professor Kevin Dreyer.

The Professional Company Production 
Arguably the centerpiece of the annual festival, the professional company production consists of a professionally mounted performance of one of the plays of William Shakespeare. The production is always directed and designed by theatrical professionals, typically from either the Chicago theatre world or the University's own faculty and staff. A number of professional actors are also employed, as well as Notre Dame and Saint Mary's students and South Bend community members. The integration of professional actors and designers with students creates a unique opportunity for those students who wish to pursue theatre as a profession following their graduation.  In recent years, students and professionals from other universities such as Ball State University, the University of Minnesota's BFA program affiliated with the Guthrie Theater, and Northwestern University have participated in NDSF.

The Young Company 
Beginning with 2003's production, the student actors and technicians in the professional company production were given the chance to perform in a production produced entirely by them (though directed by a senior company member). The roles in the Young Company performance are necessarily larger both on and offstage - the professional company's Assistant to the Technical Director may become the Young Company Technical Director, while a student playing First Soldier may have a chance to play King Richard III. Although in the past Young Company performances have taken place on the same set used for the professional company performance, 2006 saw the introduction of "green shows", performances in which Young Company members traveled to local parks in South Bend and the surrounding community.

Past Young Company Productions 
Shakespeare on Love, adapted by R. John Roberts, 2003

Shakespeare on Comedy: A Vaudeville, adapted by R. John Roberts, 2004

Falstaff's Dream, adapted by Susan Hart, 2005 (directed by Susan Hart)

The Brothers Menaechmus, by Plautus, translated by Richard Pryor with further adaptation by Jay Paul Skelton, 2006, (directed by Jay Paul Skelton)

The Learned Ladies, by Molière, directed by Kevin Asselin, 2007

The Witch, by Thomas Middleton, directed by Kevin Asselin, 2008

The Deceived or Gl'ingannati, by Accademia degli Intronati of Siena (translation by Ken Rea), directed by Kevin Asselin, 2009

The Taming of the Shrew, by William Shakespeare, directed by Kevin Asselin, 2010

As You Like It, by William Shakespeare, directed by Kevin Asselin, 2011

A Midsummer Night's Dream, by William Shakespeare, directed by Kevin Asselin, 2012

The Comedy of Errors, by William Shakespeare, directed by Kevin Asselin, 2013

ShakeScenes 
ShakeScenes is NDSF's community outreach program, employing local theatre troupes and schools to perform selected scenes from Shakespeare's works. The coordinating director for ShakeScenes from its inception until 2012 was Deborah Girasek-Chudzynski of South Bend's Stanley Clark School. In 2012, the baton was passed to Christy Burgess, the Shakespeare Outreach Program Director at Notre Dame's Robinson Community Learning Center. Participants range in age from 7 to 70, and scene directors are usually educators from local grade schools, high schools, colleges, and directors of area civic theatres. These individuals cast and direct their respective scenes as well as facilitate costumes, props, and choreography. All members of the ShakeScenes company attend acting workshops taught by local and national theatre artists.

Production History

References

External links 
 Notre Dame Shakespeare Festival official site
 University of Notre Dame official site
 Article: Summer Shakespeare Returns to Notre Dame with Henry V (08/02/05)
 Article: Playing with Assumptions Bard's (08/16/06)
 Article: Summer Shakespeare Flawless in 'Errors' (08/18/06)
 Article: Summer Shakespeare Returns to the Dome (08/23/06)
 Article: Notre Dame Shakespeare Festival Marks Three Milestones (08/17/14)

Festivals in Indiana
Shakespeare festivals in the United States
Theatre companies in Indiana
University of Notre Dame
Tourist attractions in St. Joseph County, Indiana